The donativum (plural donativa) was a gift of money by the Roman emperors to the soldiers of the Roman legions or to the Praetorian Guard. The English translation is donative.

The purpose of the donativa varied. Some were expressions of gratitude for favors received, and others outright bribery for favours expected in return. Donativa were normally rendered at the beginning of each new emperor's reign. During the 2nd and 3rd centuries, that form of bribery became a crucial part of any successful ruler in Rome. Such was the case with many of the soldier-emperors from 235 to 248.

The Praetorian Guard, intimate to the emperor's person, was an even greater threat to security. The cohorts stationed in Rome were difficult to appease and quick to assassinate. The donativum thus provided a significant way to purchase the Guard's support and loyalty.

Emperor Augustus bequeathed the Praetorian Guard a substantial sum in his will, but it was not until the reign of Tiberius that gifts of money were thought to be mandatory. The Praetorian Guard received such gifts for turning a blind eye when Sejanus, the praetorian prefect, fell from power. Each Praetorian Guard received 10 gold pieces in return for not defending Sejanus.

In 41, after the assassination of Caligula, the Guard supported Claudius, and the Senate briefly learned that the Guard had installed him on the throne. Claudius gave them 150 gold pieces, or some 3,750 denarii to which the senators' 100 sesterces were added annually to commemorate Claudius's accession. The inevitable result of the custom of the donativum was the Guard's auctioning of the empire to Didius Julianus in 193.

Imperial Donativa to the Praetorian Guard 14–193

See also
Congiarium

References

Economy of ancient Rome
Roman Empire
Roman military payments
Praetorian Guard
Economic history of Italy